Daniel Pratt Cemetery is a historical burial place in Prattville, Alabama. The cemetery dates from 1849 to 1886. It is located roughly bounded by Northington Road, 1st, 6th, Bridge, and Court Streets. The cemetery is a contributing property on the Daniel Pratt Historic District. It is also listed on the Alabama Register of Landmarks and Heritage on September 14, 1977.

Notable burials 
 Daniel Pratt (1799–1873), industrialist, founder of Pratt Gin Company
 Esther Ticknor Pratt (1808–1875), wife of Daniel Pratt
 John W. Gulick (1805–1847), artist
 William H. Fay (1841–1864), Private of the Confederate States Army

Gallery

See also 
 National Register of Historic Places listings in Autauga County, Alabama

References 

 Alabama Historical Commission: Alabama Inventory and Worksheet for Landmarks

External links
 
 

Cemeteries in Alabama
Prattville, Alabama
Historic district contributing properties in Alabama
National Register of Historic Places in Autauga County, Alabama
Cemeteries on the National Register of Historic Places in Alabama
Cemeteries established in the 1840s
1849 establishments in Alabama